Volume I is the debut studio album by German girl group Queensberry. Released by Starwatch Music, Cheyenne Records, and Warner Music on 12 December 2008 in German-speaking Europe, a week prior to the announcement of the fourth member of quartet line-up on the show's finale, the album produced three versions, each featuring a different Popstars – Just 4 Girls contestant competing to become part of the Queensberry group, including Katharina "KayKay" Kobert, Patricia Ivanauskas or eventual band member Antonella Trapani.

Starwatch consulted several producers and songwriters to work with the finalists on Volume I, including Alexander Geringas, Henrik Menzel, Tommy "Petone" Peters, John McLaughlin, Pete Kirtley, and British production team Snowflakers, some of which re-produced their material which had previously been recorded by other international artists such as Katharine McPhee, Emily Haines, Shaznay Lewis, Anna Abreu, Margaret Berger, and Clea for their respective albums.

Upon release, Volume I debuted and peaked at number three on the German Albums Chart, while reaching the top ten in Austria and the top twenty in Switzerland. It was eventually certified gold by both the BVMI and IFPI Austria, indicating sales in excess of 110,000 copies. The original version produced the double A-single "I Can't Stop Feeling"/"No Smoke", while follow-up "Too Young" appeared on the deluxe edition of Volume I, which was released in June 2009,  featuring seven additional tracks.

Track listing

Notes
"No Smoke" and "Beautiful Thing" are cover versions of the same-titled songs by British singer Michelle Lawson, recorded for I Just Wanna Say (2003).
"Dr. Blind" is a cover version of the same-titled song by British singer Canadian Emily Haines, recorded for Knives Don't Have Your Back (2006).
"Over It" is a cover version of the same-titled song by American singer Canadian Katharine McPhee, recorded for her eponymous album (2007).
"End of Love" is a cover version of the same-titled song by Finnish singer Anna Abreu, recorded for her eponymous album (2007).
"Sprung" is a cover version of the same-titled song by English girl group Clea, recorded for Identity Crisis (2004).
"Naive" is a cover version of the same-titled song by Norwegian singer Margaret Berger, recorded for Pretty Scary Silver Fairy (2006).
"Dance" is a cover version of the same-titled song by English singer Shaznay Lewis, recorded for Open (2004).

Charts

Weekly charts

Year-end charts

Certifications

Release history

References

External links
 Queensberry.de — official website

2008 debut albums
Warner Music Group albums
Queensberry (band) albums